In molecular biology, Glycoside hydrolase family 17 is a family of glycoside hydrolases. It folds into a TIM barrel.

Glycoside hydrolases  are a widespread group of enzymes that hydrolyse the glycosidic bond between two or more carbohydrates, or between a carbohydrate and a non-carbohydrate moiety. A classification system for glycoside hydrolases, based on sequence similarity, has led to the definition of >100 different families. This classification is available on the CAZy web site, and also discussed at CAZypedia, an online encyclopedia of carbohydrate active enzymes. y[ _]9
Glycoside hydrolase family 17 CAZY GH_17 comprises enzymes with several known activities; endo-1,3-beta-glucosidase; lichenase; exo-1,3-glucanase. Currently these enzymes have only been found in plants and in fungi.

References 

EC 3.2.1
GH family
Protein families